Mohammed Hayef Al-Mutairi is a member of the Kuwaiti National Assembly, representing the fourth district. Born in 1964, Al-Mutairi studied Islamic studies and served in the Kuwait Municipality before being elected to the National Assembly in 2008. Al-Mutairi affiliates with Islamist deputies.

Opposed Guaranteeing Bank Deposits
On October 28, 2008, the parliament voted 50-7 to insure all types of deposits in all local banks within Kuwait.  Al-Mutairi opposed the bill, along with Jabir Al-Azmi, Hussein Al-Qallaf Al-Bahraini, Daifallah Bouramiya, Mohammed Al-Obaid, Musallam Al-Barrak and Waleed Al-Tabtabaie.  Al-Mutairi accused the Cabinet of speeding up the bill's passage for the benefit of monetary tycoons.

Request to Grill Prime Minister Nasser
In November 2008, Al-Mutairi joined with fellow Islamist MPs Waleed Al-Tabtabaie and Mohammed Al-Mutair in filing a request to grill Prime Minister Nasser Mohammed Al-Ahmed Al-Sabah for allowing prominent Iranian Shiite cleric Mohammad Baqir al-Fali to enter Kuwait despite a legal ban. The ban was later repealed by the state court-system.

Protested Against Israeli Attacks
On December 28, 2008, Kuwaiti lawmakers Mikhled Al-Azmi, Musallam Al-Barrak, Marzouq Al-Ghanim, Jaaman Al-Harbash, Ahmad Al-Mulaifi, Mohammad Hayef Al-Mutairi, Ahmad Al-Saadoun, Nasser Al-Sane, and Waleed Al-Tabtabaie protested in front of the National Assembly building against the attacks by Israel on Gaza.  Protesters burned Israeli flags, waved banners reading, "No to hunger, no to submission" and chanted "Allahu Akbar". Israel launched air strikes against Hamas in the Gaza Strip on December 26 after a six-month ceasefire ended on December 18.

References

Kuwaiti people of Arab descent
Members of the National Assembly (Kuwait)
Living people
1964 births